Primo Victoria (Latin for "Victory First") is the debut studio album by Swedish heavy metal band Sabaton.

The band had previously recorded the full length album Metalizer with Italian label Underground Symphony, but due to conflicts its release was delayed until 2007. Primo Victoria instead became Sabaton's debut album, recorded in 2004 in Abyss Studios, and released the following year with their new label, Black Lodge Records.

In 2010 the album was re-released on German label Nuclear Blast, with six additional bonus tracks, under the name Primo Victoria Re-Armed. The re-release reached 43rd place in the Swedish album charts.

Lyrics theme 
Sabaton used themes of war history in Primo Victoria, a style they have continued ever since. According to singer Joakim Brodén, he and bass player Pär Sundström had written the music for the title track, but were missing lyrics. Because they felt the song had a "big sound", they wanted a big subject, and chose the allied invasion of Normandy during World War II. Having to do some research on the historic events, they decided they liked the meaning that the subject added to the song, and decided to give the whole album a war history theme.

Track listing

Personnel 
 Joakim Brodén – lead vocals and keyboard
 Rickard Sundén – guitar and backing vocals
 Oskar Montelius – guitar and backing vocals
 Pär Sundström – bass guitar
 Daniel Mullback – drums

"Second Battalion" and "Amphibious Battalion"
The band was commissioned by members of the Norwegian Army 2nd Battalion to make an alternative version of Panzer Battalion. The alternate version, called Second Battalion, differs only in that the lyric "Second Battalion" is sung in place of "Panzer Battalion".

The band also later created another alternate version of Panzer Battalion named Amphibious Battalion for the Swedish marines fighting in Chad as a part of EUFOR.

Covers
 German a cappella metal group van Canto covered "Primo Victoria" on their fourth studio album Break the Silence in 2011, with Sabaton frontman Joakim Brodén appearing as a guest vocalist and in the music video.

Cross-promotion with Wargaming
As part of Nuclear Blast's 30th anniversary, in 2017, Sabaton announced through their website that they were beginning a long-term collaboration with Wargaming. The band stated they often play World of Tanks between shows. This collaboration resulted in the filming of a music video for the song "Primo Victoria", as well as the custom-painted Swedish Army Centurion tank featured in the video being made available for purchase in World of Tanks.

References

External links

"Primo Victoria" music video on Nuclear Blast's YouTube channel
Primo Victoria music video and lyrics on Blogul lui Laivindur website

2005 debut albums
Sabaton (band) albums